Javier Baraja Vegas (born 24 August 1980) is a Spanish former footballer who played as a defensive midfielder or a central defender, currently a manager.

He spent most of his professional career with Valladolid, appearing in 229 competitive games and playing six La Liga seasons with the club (ten in total).

Playing career
Born in Valladolid, Castile and León, and a product of hometown Real Valladolid's youth system, Baraja's first appearance in La Liga was on 26 August 2001 as he played 17 minutes in a 4–0 away loss against Deportivo de La Coruña. He only featured in one more match in that first season, totalling 107 minutes of action.

After stints in Segunda División, appearing scarcely with Getafe CF in two years (he played 13 games in his second year as the Madrid side achieved a first-ever promotion to the top division) and spending one season with Málaga CF's reserves, Baraja returned to Valladolid in 2005–06. He played 28 times as the club returned to the top flight the following campaign.

Relatively used during the 2007–08 and 2008–09 seasons, Baraja scored his first goal for Valladolid on 13 September 2008, netting a penalty in a 2–1 home win over Atlético Madrid. He experienced a further two top-tier relegations with them until his retirement at the age of 34, adding one promotion in 2012 and often acting as team captain.

Coaching career
On 23 May 2019, Baraja was appointed the new manager of Valladolid's reserves in Segunda División B, replacing Miguel Rivera who had stepped down two days earlier. He resigned from his position in June 2021, with 23 wins and 17 draws from 53 matches and a playoff appearance in his first season.

Baraja signed with Segunda División club UD Ibiza on 8 June 2022. He was dismissed on 22 October, after only three victories in 12 games.

Personal life
Baraja's older brother, Rubén, was also a footballer and manager. The midfielder was also groomed at Valladolid but played mainly for Valencia CF whom he also coached, and collected over 40 caps for Spain.

Managerial statistics

Honours
Valladolid
Segunda División: 2006–07

Spain U16
UEFA European Under-16 Championship: 1997

References

External links

1980 births
Living people
Spanish footballers
Footballers from Valladolid
Association football defenders
Association football midfielders
Association football utility players
La Liga players
Segunda División players
Segunda División B players
Tercera División players
Real Valladolid Promesas players
Real Valladolid players
Getafe CF footballers
Atlético Malagueño players
Spain youth international footballers
Spanish football managers
Segunda División managers
Segunda División B managers
UD Ibiza managers